Vancouver, British Columbia, Canada, has more high-rise buildings per capita than most North American metropolitan centres with populations exceeding 1,000,000. Vancouver's population density is the 4th-highest in North America and the city has more residential high-rises per capita than any other city on the continent.

There are roughly 650 high-rise buildings that equal or exceed , and roughly 50 buildings that equal or exceed 100 metres (328 ft). Vancouver has 27 protected view corridors which limit the construction of tall buildings which interfere with the line of sight to the North Shore Mountains, the downtown skyline, and the waters of English Bay and the Strait of Georgia. Almost all of Vancouver's buildings that exceed 100 metres in height are located within Downtown Vancouver.

The tallest building in Vancouver is the 62-storey,  Living Shangri-La; the building represents the city's efforts to add visual interest into Vancouver's skyline. The recently completed Paradox Hotel Vancouver, also known as Vancouver's Turn, is now the city's second tallest building, at 188 metres (616 ft). One Wall Centre has the distinction of being the first building in the world to use a tuned liquid column damper to control wind vibrations. 

Vancouver's history of skyscrapers began with the Dominion Building (1909), the Sun Tower (1911) (originally named the World Tower, then the News-Advertiser Tower, after the newspaper it was home to in each case), the Vancouver Block (1912), the second Hotel Vancouver (1916) and the Marine Building (1929).

Building construction remained slow in the city until the late 1960s, other than the completion of the new BC Electric headquarters (soon renamed BC Hydro headquarters, and today the Electra condominiums). From 1968 to 1981, Vancouver witnessed a major expansion of skyscraper and high-rise construction. Many of the city's office towers were completed during this period, such as the Harbour Centre, Bentall Centre, Royal Centre, Granville Square and Pacific Centre office tower/mall complexes. A ten-year lull in building construction came after the expansion, though Vancouver experienced a larger second building expansion beginning in 1991 and continuing into the present.

In the last two decades Vancouver's pioneering urbanism, with its density and innovative developments, has been emulated by major cities throughout the world. As part of the city's push for liveable high-density areas (called Vancouverism by planning theorists), many mixed-use and residential buildings were built, such as Concord Pacific Place, the largest master-planned residential complex in North America.


While highrise development outside of the downtown core had been nearly nonexistent due to zoning restrictions and view cones, recent transit oriented developments like Marine Gateway and the upcoming Oakridge Park are centered around Canada line stations of the Skytrain, Metro Vancouver's light metro system, in order to increase residential density and reduce car reliance. They will have the tallest building heights outside of Downtown Vancouver.

Tallest buildings
This list ranks buildings in Vancouver that stand at least 100 m (328 ft) tall, based on CTBUH height measurement standards. This includes spires and architectural details but does not include antenna masts. An equal sign (=) following a rank indicates the same height between two or more buildings.

* Indicates buildings that are still under construction but have been topped out.
= Indicates buildings that have the same rank because they have the same height.

Tallest proposed and under construction

Under construction

Approved and Proposed

Tallest demolished

This table lists buildings in Vancouver that were demolished or destroyed and at one time stood at least  in height.

Timeline of tallest buildings

This is a list of buildings that in the past held the title of tallest building in Vancouver.

See also

 Architecture of Vancouver
 List of heritage buildings in Vancouver
 List of tallest buildings in Canada
 List of tallest buildings in British Columbia
 List of tallest buildings in Burnaby

References
General
 
 
 
Specific

External links
 Diagram of Vancouver skyscrapers on SkyscraperPage

Vancouver
 
Tallest buildings
Tallest buildings in Vancouver